Nansang is a town in Namsang District of Shan State in eastern Burma. It is the seat of Nansang Township. It is the biggest city of the eastern central of the Shan State in Myanmar. It is 72 miles away from Taunggyi. A pagoda lies in the southern part of the town. It is also known as Taung Paw Pagoda.

Formation of District
On April 30, 2022, new districts were expanded across the country. Namsang and Kunhing Townships from Loilem District
 Mong Nai Township was separated from Langkho District and formed as Namsang District. The townships and cities included in Namsang District are as follows
 Namsang
 Kho Lam
 Kunhing
 KaLi
 Mong Nai
 Keng Tawng

Population and Ethnic

Most people are Buddhist. There are nearly thirty Buddhist monasteries. This region has a population of 70,000 people, most of whom are villagers engaged in agriculture. Only 20,000 people live in town. Most people are Shan. There is chauvinism for few people (Burmese, Paoh, Yinn, Ta'ang, Lahu, Lisu, etc).

Education

Public School 
 No(1) Basic Education High School
 No(2) Basic Education High School (Myoma)
 Myo Oo Basic Education Sub High School
 No(5) Basic Education Sub High School
 Air Army Basic Education High School

Private School 
 Kaung Myat Private High School
 Brightstar Private Basic School
 Pyin Nyar Young Chi Private Basic School

Health Centre

Public Health 
 General Hospital (25 Bedded)
 Army Hospital , 8th MB (100 Bedded)

Private Health 
 Khaing Myittar Hospital
 Cherry Hospital
 Myat Mon Hospital
 Moe Makha Hospital

Transport

Airport 
It is served by Nansang Airport, where a former RAF base was located and Myanmar Air Force base.

Buses ang Taxis 
It is well-connected by road, lying at the junction of National Highway 4 and National Highway 45 which connects it to Mong Ton and the Thai border.

Railway 
Since 1995 it has been served by a station on the Myanmar Railways network.

Regional Military Commands (RMC) 

 For better command and communication, the Tatmadaw formed Regional Military Commands structure in 1958. Until 1961, there were only two regional commands, they were supported by 13 Infantry brigades and an infantry division. In October 1961, new regional military commands were opened and leaving only two independent infantry brigades. In June 1963, the Naypyidaw Command was temporarily formed in Yangon with the deputy commander and some staff officers drawn from Central Command. It was reorganised and renamed as Yangon Command on 1 June 1965.

A total of 337 infantry and light infantry battalions organised in Tactical Operations Commands, 37 independent field artillery regiments supported by affiliated support units including armoured reconnaissance and tank battalions. RMCs are similar to corps formations in Western armies. The RMCs, commanded by major general rank officer, are managed through a framework of Bureau of Special Operations (BSOs), which are equivalent to Field Army Group in Western terms..

Eastern Central Command Namsang 

Eastern Central Command() is saturated Middle Shan state in Namsang. Formed in 2011 Infantry Battalions.

Air Bases

Myanmar Air Force also utilised civilian airfields as front-line air fields in case of foreign invasion.
 Namsang Air Base
 Namsang Airport

Climate
Namsang has a humid subtropical climate (Köppen climate classification Cwa), closely bordering a subtropical highland climate (Cwb). There is a winter dry season (December–March) and a summer wet-season (April–November). Temperatures are warm throughout the year; the winter months (December–February) are milder but the nights can be quite cool.

Demographics

2014

The 2014 Myanmar Census reported that Namsang Township had a population of 72,098. The population density was 350.1 people per km².

List of Banks being operated

See also 

 Nansang Township

References

External links 
 https://www.facebook.com/Namsangnet/

Populated places in Shan State
Township capitals of Myanmar